In interior design and furniture design, Transitional Style refers to a contemporary style mixing traditional and modern styles, incorporating old world traditional and the world of chrome and glass contemporary.

Features
The style combines curves with straight lines to create a design that balances masculine and feminine attributes, aiming to create a comfortable and relaxing style. A lack of ornamentation and decoration with minimal accessories keeps the focus on the simplicity and sophistication of the design.  Color palettes are typically neutral and subtle and may be monochromatic, with color in art and accents rather than upholstery and floors.

Unlike contemporary furniture, transitional style focuses on comfort and practicality, to meet the lifestyle of an active household. The scales of furniture pieces are ample but not overwhelming. Goose feather and down fill is typically used for upholstered furniture, wood species (maple, mahogany, walnut, etc.) and wood finishing is typically warm tones but can range from a natural finish to a high-gloss lacquer. Texture is important, and fabric selections can vary from durable materials to sophisticated, plush fabrics, with tone-on-tone or small scale graphics. A balanced mix of several textures is often used.

Designers
21st century transitional style furniture designers include Nina Petronzio and Thomas Pheasant.

References 

Design
Interior design
History of furniture
Furniture